No. 17 is a 1926 thriller novel by the British writer Joseph Jefferson Farjeon, inspired by his successful play of the same title from the previous year. Along with the play it provided inspiration for Alfred Hitchcock's 1932 film Number Seventeen.

It is the first of a series of stories featuring the character of Ben, a former merchant sailor now down-on-his-luck, who continually gets involved in adventures.

References

Bibliography
 Maurice Yacowar. Hitchcock's British Films. Wayne State University Press, 2010.

External links
 
 

1926 British novels
Novels by Joseph Jefferson Farjeon
British thriller novels
British novels adapted into films
Novels set in London
Hodder & Stoughton books